Beitaipingzhuang Subdistrict is a subdistrict located inside of Haidian District, Beijing, China. It borders Huayuan Road Subdistrict to the northeast, Desheng Subdistrict to the east, Zhanlan Road and Xinjiekou Subdistricts to the south, Zhongguancun and Beixiaguan Subdistrict to the west. According to the result of the 2020 census, the population of Beitaipingzhuang was 163,920. 

The name Beitaipingzhuang refers to its location north of Taipingzhuang, an once-existed village that was founded by refuges fleeing from the Oirats' siege of Beijing in 1449.

History

Administrative Divisions 
Beitaipingzhuang Subdistrict consisted of 32 communities as of 2021:

See also 

 List of township-level divisions of Beijing

References 

Haidian District
Subdistricts of Beijing